Riacho de Santo Antônio is a municipality in the state of Paraíba in Brazil. The population is 1,974 (2020 est.) in an area of 91.32 km².

References

External links
citybrazil.com.br 
on Explorevale 

Municipalities in Paraíba